Carlos Pereyra may refer to:

 Carlos Pereyra (boxer) (born 1911), Argentine boxer
 Carlos Pereyra (writer), Mexican lawyer, diplomat, writer and historian
 Carlos Julio Pereyra (1922–2020), Uruguayan schoolteacher, author and politician

See also
 Carlos Pereyra School, Torreón, Mexico, named for the writer and historian